Achard–Thiers syndrome (also known as diabetic-bearded woman syndrome) is a rare disorder mainly occurring in postmenopausal women. It is characterized by type II diabetes mellitus and signs related to the overproduction of androgens.

The disease is named for Emile Achard and Joseph Thiers.

Presentation
Achard–Thiers syndrome affects mostly postmenopausal women and comprises diabetes mellitus, deep voice, hirsutism, clitoral hypertrophy and adrenal cortical hyperplasia or adenoma. Patients often also have amenorrhoea, hypertension and osteoporosis.

Diagnosis

Treatment

References
 B.G. Firkin & J.A.Whitworth (1987). Dictionary of Medical Eponyms. Parthenon Publishing. 
 Who Named It?

Specific

External links 

Syndromes affecting the endocrine system
Diseases named for discoverer